Two former collegiate basketball coaches were named Bill Foster, who may refer to:
Bill Foster (basketball, born 1929) (1929–2016), former coach of Rutgers, Utah, Duke, South Carolina and Northwestern
Bill Foster (basketball, born 1936) (1936–2015), former coach of Charlotte, Clemson and Virginia Tech
 Bill Foster (disambiguation)